No. 598 Squadron RAF was an Anti-aircraft Co-operation squadron of the Royal Air Force during the Second World War.

History
The squadron was formed on 1 December 1943 at RAF Peterhead, Scotland from No. 1479 Flight RAF and No. 1632 Flight RAF. It was tasked as an Anti-aircraft Co-operation Unit to cover the north east of Scotland and though officially based at Peterhead, it had detachments all over Scotland. The squadron continued in its role to March 1945, when it moved south to RAF Bircham Newton and re-equipped with the Bristol Beaufighter. It disbanded at Bircham Newton on 30 April 1945.

Aircraft operated

Squadron bases

See also
List of Royal Air Force aircraft squadrons

References

Notes

Bibliography

External links
 Squadron histories for nos. 541–598 sqn on RafWeb's Air of Authority – A History of RAF Organisation

Aircraft squadrons of the Royal Air Force in World War II
Military units and formations established in 1943
598 Squadron